Robert Douglas Watt  (born 1945) is a former Canadian museum curator and officer of arms who served as the first Chief Herald of Canada. He was appointed at the foundation of the Canadian Heraldic Authority in 1988, and he was succeeded by Claire Boudreau in 2007.

Life and career
Watt was born in Picton, Ontario, in 1945. He received a Bachelor of Arts in 1967 and a Master of Arts in 1968 from Carleton University. From 1969 to 1970, he was an archivist for the Public Archives of Canada. From 1971 to 1973, he was the Vancouver City Archivist.

In 1973, he was appointed as Curator of History at the Vancouver Centennial Museum (now the Vancouver Museum). He became Chief Curator in 1977 and was Director from 1980 to 1988. He was appointed as the first Chief Herald of Canada in 1988, and he served in that position until 2007.

He was appointed as a Lieutenant of the Royal Victorian Order (LVO) in the 2008 New Year Honours and received his insignia from the Prince of Wales at Buckingham Palace on May 16, 2008. Watt is also an Officer of the Most Venerable Order of the Hospital of St. John and has been awarded the 125th Anniversary of the Confederation of Canada Medal, the Queen Elizabeth II Golden Jubilee Medal and the Queen Elizabeth Diamond Jubilee Medal. He was made an Honorary Senior Fellow of Renison University College in 1990.

He is currently the Honorary Lieutenant Colonel for 12 (Vancouver) Field Ambulance. Watt served as a citizenship judge in Vancouver from September 2009 to September 2015. He was president of the Académie Internationale d'Héraldique between 2015 and 2022.

In 2019, he wrote People Among the People: The Public Art of Susan Point, a non-fiction book describes the collected work of Susan Point through interviews and archival research.

He is married to Alison Watt (née Logan), the former Director, University Secretariat of Simon Fraser University.

Coat of arms

See also
 Royal Heraldry Society of Canada

Notes

References

External links
 Coat of arms of Robert Douglas Watt

1945 births
Living people
20th-century Canadian civil servants
21st-century Canadian civil servants
Canadian Heraldic Authority
Canadian officers of arms
Carleton University alumni
Chief Heralds of Canada
Fellows of the Royal Heraldry Society of Canada
Lieutenants of the Royal Victorian Order
People from Prince Edward County, Ontario
Flag designers
Canadian citizenship judges